William “Playoff/Payoff Willy” aka “The Short Boy” Compton III (born September 19, 1989) is an American football linebacker who is a free agent. He played college football at the University of Nebraska–Lincoln and originally signed with the Washington Redskins as an undrafted free agent in 2013. He has also played for the Oakland Raiders, Tennessee Titans, and the Las Vegas Raiders. He is also the co-host of the Barstool Sports podcast, Bussin' With The Boys, along with former Titans offensive tackle Taylor Lewan.

Early life
As a football player for North County High School, Compton played linebacker and wide receiver. A first-team all-state selection, Compton was listed as one of the top five players entering college from Missouri high schools. He chose to go to the University of Nebraska over Notre Dame, Vanderbilt and others. He was redshirted in 2008. He won a starting position with the Cornhuskers the next year. Compton was a three-time Academic All-Big Ten selection, and he was team captain as a senior in 2012. Compton went on to play in the 2013 NFLPA Collegiate Bowl.

Professional career

Washington Redskins

2013 season
On April 29, 2013, the Washington Redskins signed Compton to a three-year, $1.48 million contract that includes a signing bonus of $5,000 as an undrafted free agent. Throughout training camp, Compton competed for a roster spot as a backup inside linebacker against Jeremy Kimbrough, Keenan Robinson, and Brandon Jenkins.

On August 31, 2013, Compton was waived as a part of final roster cuts, but was signed to the team's practice squad after clearing waivers. On December 24, the team promoted Compton to the active roster after Nick Barnett sustained a sprained MCL. On December 29, 2013, Compton made his professional regular season debut and recorded one solo tackle as the Redskins lost 20-6 at the New York Giants. He finished his rookie season with one tackle in one game.

2014 season
After the 2014 preseason, Compton remained on the active 53-man roster as a reserve inside linebacker. In Week 6 against the Arizona Cardinals, he made his first career start in place of an injured Perry Riley. In 2014, Compton ranked second on the team with 18 special teams stops.

2015 season

Originally beginning the 2015 season as a reserve inside linebacker, Compton filled in as a starter for an injured Keenan Robinson. Head coach Jay Gruden announced that Compton "cemented a role as a starter on this football team based on his play.” He recorded his first career interception on quarterback Kellen Moore in last game of the regular season against the Dallas Cowboys. Due to starting ten games, he earned a $222,465.82 bonus. He finished the 2015 season with a career-best 122 tackles, a sack, an interception, six passes defensed, and a fumble recovery.

2016 season
On March 4, 2016, the Redskins extended a tender to Compton. He started 15 games in 2016 recording 106 tackles, along with five passes defensed, two fumble recoveries, one forced fumble and an interception.

2017 season
The Redskins re-signed Compton signed on April 24, 2017, on a restricted free agent tender. He was placed on injured reserve on November 14, 2017, after suffering a Lisfranc sprain.

Tennessee Titans
On April 2, 2018, Compton signed a one-year contract with the Tennessee Titans.

New Orleans Saints
Compton signed with the New Orleans Saints on August 21, 2019. He was placed on injured reserve on August 30, 2019. He was released from injured reserve with an injury settlement on September 5.

Oakland Raiders
On October 30, 2019, Compton was signed by the Oakland Raiders.

Tennessee Titans (second stint) 
Compton re-signed with the Titans on August 27, 2020. He was released on October 26, and re-signed to the practice squad the next day. He was elevated to the active roster on November 21 and 28 for the team's weeks 11 and 12 games against the Baltimore Ravens and Indianapolis Colts, and reverted to the practice squad after each game. He was promoted to the active roster on December 1, 2020.

Las Vegas Raiders
On December 8, 2021, Compton signed with the practice squad of the Las Vegas Raiders, and was signed to the active roster three days later. On January 11, 2022, Compton was cut from the Raiders.

On November 21, 2022, Compton planned to sign with the practice squad of the Atlanta Falcons, but eight days later he announced that the signing was unable to happen due to some of his affiliation with Barstool Sports.

Personal life 
In 2019, Compton created a podcast called "Bussin with the Boys" along with former Titans offensive lineman Taylor Lewan, which is part of the Barstool Sports podcast network. In 2021, former Washington Football Team cheerleader Charo Bishop announced she was engaged to Compton. On June 26, 2021, Compton and Bishop got married in Montana. On April 3, 2022, the couple welcomed daughter Cerulean Belle.

References

External links

 Nebraska Cornhuskers bio
 Tennessee Titans bio

1989 births
Living people
American football linebackers
Nebraska Cornhuskers football players
People from Bonne Terre, Missouri
Players of American football from Missouri
Sportspeople from Greater St. Louis
Tennessee Titans players
Washington Redskins players
New Orleans Saints players
Oakland Raiders players
Las Vegas Raiders players
Barstool Sports people